Frank Featherstone Bonsall FRS (31 March 1920, Crouch End, London – 22 February 2011, Harrogate) was a British mathematician.

Personal life
Bonsall was born on 31 March 1920, the youngest son of Wilfred C Bonsall and Sarah Frank. His older brother was Arthur Bonsall. He married Gillian Patrick, a Somerville graduate, in 1947. Bonsall and his wife were keen hill-walkers. He wrote two articles for The Scottish Mountaineering Club on the definition of a Munro. After his retirement, Bonsall and his wife moved to Harrogate.

Career
Bonsall graduated from Bishop's Stortford College in 1938, and studied at Merton College, Oxford.
He served in World War II, in the Corps of Royal Engineers, and in India from 1944 to 1946.

He lectured at the University of Edinburgh from 1947 to 1948; was visiting associate professor at Oklahoma State University from 1950 to 1951; taught at Newcastle University, with Werner Wolfgang Rogosinski in the 1950s. He taught at the University of Edinburgh, from 1963 to 1984. In 1963, a second chair in Mathematics was established (the Maclaurin chair). Bonsall took up the chair in 1965, but spent the following year as a visiting professor at Yale. In 1966, he was awarded the London Mathematical Society's Berwick Prize.

Despite not himself having a PhD, Bonsall supervised many PhD candidates who knew him affectionately as "FFB".

Works
Compact linear operators, Yale University, Dept. of Mathematics, 1967
Frank F. Bonsall, John Duncan, Numerical ranges of operators and normed spaces and of all elements of normed algebras, London Mathematical Society, 1971
Frank F. Bonsall, J. Duncan, Numerical ranges II, Cambridge univ. press, 1973
Frank F. Bonsall, J. Duncan, Complete normed algebras, 1973

See also
 Arthur Bonsall
 Berwick Prize
 List of fellows of the Royal Society elected in 1970
 List of mathematicians (B)

References

External links
Frank Bonsall - The Mathematics Genealogy Project
search on author FF Bonsall from Google Scholar

1920 births
2011 deaths
20th-century British mathematicians
21st-century British mathematicians
Academics of the University of Edinburgh
Alumni of Merton College, Oxford
British Army personnel of World War II
Fellows of the Royal Society
People educated at Bishop's Stortford College
People from Crouch End
British people in colonial India